Michael Clayton: Original Motion Picture Soundtrack is the original soundtrack of the 2007 drama film, Michael Clayton, starring George Clooney, Tom Wilkinson, and Tilda Swinton. The original score was composed by James Newton Howard. The album was released on September 25, 2007 on the Varèse Sarabande label.

Awards
The album was nominated for an Academy Award for Best Original Score.

Track listing 
All tracks composed by James Newton Howard.
"Main Titles" – 2:12
"Chinatown" –  2:27
"Drive to the Field" –  1:35
"Just Another Day" –  2:20
"Meeting Karen" –  2:46
"Looking for Arthur" –  1:41
"U North" –  1:49
"Arthur & Henry" –  2:11
"Times Square" –  3:38
"Mr. Verne" –  2:28
"I'm Not the Guy You Kill" –  6:57
"Horses" –  2:13
"25 Dollars Worth" –  6:27

Performed by The Hollywood Studio Symphony. Conducted by Blake Neely.

References

External links
 Michael Clayton at Soundtrack Collector

Film scores
2007 soundtrack albums
Thriller film soundtracks